Alain raymondi is a species of crab in the Pinnotheridae family. It was first described in 2008 by Ahyong and Peter Ng. The species epithet, raymondi, honours Ray Manning.

Currently it is known only from the Philippines, where it is found at depths of 453– 787 m.

References

Crustaceans described in 2008
Taxa named by Shane T. Ahyong
Pinnotheroidea